James B. Brown may refer to:

 James Baldwin Brown (1820–1884), British Congregational minister
 James Boyer Brown (1919–2009), Australian gynaecologist
 James Brown (bishop of Louisiana) (born 1932)

See also
James B. Brown House, historic home built near Hannibal, Missouri in the 1870s and named for a prominent local resident
J. B. Brown (born 1967), nickname of American football player James Harold Brown